Nucleolar protein 12 is a protein that in humans is encoded by the NOL12 gene. Human NOL12 has been shown to localize in the nucleolus and regulate nucleolar structure and homeostasis by maintaining the levels of multi-functional fibrillarin and nucleolin proteins. Its deficiency leads to p53 activation resulting in G2 arrest of cell. Nol12 or hNol12 drives p53 induced cell senescence suggesting its important role in aging. Human Nol12 is also required for ribosome maturation and genome integrity.

Nol12 Family 

Human Nol12 belongs to family of proteins known as ribosomal binding proteins RBPs. The human members have equivalents in different species. Its homologue in Drosophila melanogaster is called Viriato which is involved in eye and nervous system development and without Viriato, Drosophila melanogaster eye development fails. Loss of also Viriato resulted in cell proliferation, developmental delays and apoptosis. hNOL12 homologue in rats is known as Nop25 and is responsible for nucleolar structure and integrity. Its yeast homologue has been named as Rrp17 which has been shown to possess 5′-3′ exonuclease activity and is involved in ribosome biogenesis.

References

Further reading